Ring Ka King (English: King of the Ring) was an Indian professional wrestling brand of Total Nonstop Action Wrestling (TNA, now known as Impact Wrestling). Filming for the promotion's television product began in December 2011 with the backing of Endemol and debuted on India's The Colors Network on 28 January 2012. The first season of 26 episodes concluded on 22 April.

Jeff Jarrett was in charge of the promotion, working alongside Dave Lagana, Sonjay Dutt and Jeremy Borash. Savio Vega and Nick Dinsmore were responsible for training the Indian talent at Ohio Valley Wrestling.

History
In 2011, TNA announced a project in India. The project was revealed to be an original televised wrestling program intended for the Indian market, titled Ring Ka King. The promotion was managed by Jeff Jarrett. Jeremy Borash, Dave Lagana and Sonjay Dutt helped Jarrett with management.

Ring Ka King was taped in India, and featured both Indian and non-Indian wrestlers performing on the show. A majority of the non-Indian wrestlers were under contract with TNA; this included Zema Ion, Scott Steiner, and Abyss, among others. Independent wrestlers Sonjay Dutt, Isaiah Cash and American Adonis were also featured on the show.

After the first season of Ring Ka King, TNA expressed doubts that a second would be produced.

Championships

RKK World Heavyweight Championship
The RKK World Heavyweight Championship was a professional wrestling heavyweight championship and the highest ranked title in the promotion. RKK hosted a tournament to crown the first champion.

Title tournament

RKK Tag Team Championship
The RKK Tag Team Championship was a professional wrestling tag team championship in the Ring Ka King promotion. RKK hosted a tournament to crown the first champions.

Title tournament

Alumni

Male wrestlers

Female wrestlers

Management

International broadcasters

See also

Professional wrestling in India
List of professional wrestling television series
100% De Dana Dan

References

External links
Ring Ka King at ImpactWrestling.com
Ring Ka King at IMDB.com
Harbhajan to endorse Ring Ka King

Professional wrestling promotions
Colors TV original programming
2012 Indian television series debuts
2012 Indian television series endings
Hindi-language television shows
Professional wrestling in India
Impact Wrestling television shows
Indian professional wrestling television series